King's Mead Mill (also Battle Windmill or Caldbec Hill Mill) is a grade II listed smock mill at Battle, Sussex, England, which has been converted to residential accommodation.

History

King's Mead Mill was built in 1805, replacing a post mill. The mill was working until the First World War and in 1924 was stripped of its machinery and house converted. The work was done by Neve's, the Heathfield millwrights.

Description

King's Mead Mill is a four-storey smock mill on a single-storey brick base. It has a Kentish-style cap winded by a fantail. When working it had four shuttered sails carried on a cast-iron windshaft, driving three pairs of millstones. The current windshaft is a dummy, added when the mill was converted. The original windshaft is displayed at Polegate windmill.

Millers

William Neve 1805 - 1839
Porter 1839 - 1860
Henry Harmer
1911-1914 freeman
Jenner - WWI

References

External links
Windmill World Page on Battle Windmill.

Further reading
 Online version

Smock mills in England
Grinding mills in the United Kingdom
Grade II listed buildings in East Sussex
Windmills completed in 1805
Windmills in East Sussex
Octagonal buildings in the United Kingdom
1805 establishments in England